Dmitry Andreyevich Migunov (born 21 November 1992) is a Russian short-track speed-skater.

World Cup Podiums

References

 

1992 births
Living people
Russian male short track speed skaters
Sportspeople from Ufa